Major General George Owen Squier (March 21, 1865 – March 24, 1934) was born in Dryden, Michigan, United States. He graduated from the United States Military Academy in the Class of 1887 and received a Ph.D. from Johns Hopkins University in 1893.

He was famous both in the United States and in Europe as a soldier, a scientist and as an inventor. He is known for what today is called Muzak.

Life and military career

George Squier wrote and edited many books and articles on the subject of radio and electricity. An inventor, he and Dartmouth professor Albert Cushing Crehore developed a magneto-optical streak camera "The Polarizing Photo-chronograph" in 1896 to measure the speed of projectiles both inside a cannon and directly after they left the cannon barrel. This was one of the earliest photonic programs. They also worked to develop synchronous AC telegraphic systems. His biggest contribution was that of telephone carrier multiplexing in 1910 for which he was elected to the National Academy of Sciences in 1919.

As executive officer to the Chief Signal Officer, U.S. Signal Corps in 1907, Squier was instrumental in the establishment of the Aeronautical Division, U.S. Signal Corps, the first organizational ancestor of the US Air Force. He also was the first military passenger in an airplane on September 12, 1908 and, working with the Wright Brothers, was responsible for the purchase of the first airplanes by the US Army in 1909.

From May 1916 to February 1917, he was Chief of the Aviation Section, U.S. Signal Corps, the first successor of the Aeronautical Division, before being promoted to major general and appointed Chief Signal Officer during World War I.

In 1922, he created Wired Radio, a service which piped music to businesses and subscribers over wires. In 1934, he changed the service's name to 'Muzak'.

Asked how to say his name, he told The Literary Digest it was pronounced like the word square.

He was a member of the Sons of the American Revolution.

Death
He died in Washington, D.C., at George Washington Hospital on March 24, 1934 of pneumonia, and was buried in Arlington National Cemetery.

Awards
 Distinguished Service Medal
 Spanish War Service Medal
 Philippine Campaign Medal
 World War I Victory Medal
 Honorary Knight Commander of the Order of St Michael and St George
 Commander of the Legion of Honor (France)
 Commander of the Order of the Crown of Italy

Dates of rank

Legacy

In 1943, the U.S. Navy named troopship  in his honor.

General Squier Park, a historic district and waterpark in his hometown of Dryden, Michigan, is named in his honor.

Publications

References

External links
 George O. Squier (Cullum's Register entry)
 Smithsonian West Point: George Squier
 National Academy of Science
 United States Army Signal Center 
 About Major General George Owen Squier

1865 births
1934 deaths
American telecommunications industry businesspeople
20th-century American inventors
History of aviation
Burials at Arlington National Cemetery
Deaths from pneumonia in Washington, D.C.
Johns Hopkins University alumni
Recipients of the Distinguished Service Medal (US Army)
Recipients of the Legion of Honour
United States Army generals of World War I
United States Army generals
United States Military Academy alumni
Wright brothers
People from Lapeer County, Michigan
Honorary Knights Commander of the Order of St Michael and St George
Members of the United States National Academy of Sciences
Chief Signal Officer, U.S. Army
Deaths from pneumonia in the United States